Events in the year 2018 in Mali.

Incumbents
 President – Ibrahim Boubacar Keïta 
 Prime Minister – Soumeylou Boubèye Maïga

Events

29 July – scheduled date for the Malian presidential election, 2018

November or December – scheduled date for the Malian parliamentary election, 2018

Deaths

 9 June – Ogobara Doumbo, medical researcher (b. 1956).

19 August – Khaira Arby, singer (b. 1959).

22 October – Mahamadou Djeri Maïga, politician and Azawad separatist (b. 1972).

28 December – Seydou Badian Kouyaté, writer and politician (b. 1928).

References

 
2010s in Mali 
Years of the 21st century in Mali 
Mali 
Mali